Andi Durrant (born 1981) is an English radio presenter, company co-founder, disc jockey and record producer from Leeds, West Yorkshire, England.

Durrant currently hosts The Dance Music Archive radio show on Kisstory in the UK

Radio presenter
He is most notable for his support of electronic and dance music on British and international radio - having presented long-standing programs on Kiss, Capital, Nova FM Australia and previously Galaxy. Durrant has received 3  Sony Radio Academy Awards and been nominated for 3 Arqiva Radio Awards for "Best Specialist Program". Durrant joined Galaxy FM aged 16 in 1998 as one of the UK's youngest radio presenters, and took over Friday and Saturday nights on the new Capital FM national network in January 2011.

He left Capital in September 2013 to launch his production company This Is Distorted and joined the new Kiss FM network, KissFresh, in March 2014. His Electrik Playground radio show was broadcast every Sunday at 9pm on KissFresh and the Nova network in Australia, and was syndicated to stations in New York, Florida, Boston, Australia, Colombia, Mexico, Egypt, Canada, Ireland and Cyprus.

He has conducted interviews and made one-off specials with The Prodigy, Pet Shop Boys, Example, Faithless, Calvin Harris, Groove Armada, and Daft Punk.

In 2021 Durrant launched the Dance Music Archive

Other presentation roles
Durrant was the presenter of Tidy TV, the regular TV programme from British dance music brand Tidy. He also presents (uncredited) "Transmission Radio"  - the networked radio show of Transmission, and BClub Radio in Barcelona.

Executive Producer
Andi Durrant has acted as executive producer and co-writer of a number of other radio shows:
 Sun:Sets - with Chicane (musician)
 Music For a Harder Generation with The Tidy Boys
 Paul van Dyk - VONYC Sessions
 Don Diablo - Hexagon Radio
 deadmau5 - Mau5trap Radio
 The Hustle - with Roger Sanchez
 A Little Respect with Andy Bell (singer)
 Dance Britannia with Sister Bliss

Awards

This Is Distorted
Durrant co-founded UK production company This Is Distorted in 2013 with long-term business partner Nick Riley. The company produces and syndicates international radio shows and podcasts for electronic artists and brands such as deadmau5, Don Diablo, Defected Records, Paul Van Dyk, Chicane, Claptone, MK, Nora En Pure, EDX, Alok, Sister Bliss, Sirius XM and British Airways, alongside podcasts from Owen Jones, Roger Sanchez, Cafe Direct, Clint Boon and the NHS.

DJ and record producer
Durrant has produced 130 tracks and remixes for a wide range of recording artists including Armin Van Buuren, Paul Van Dyk, Laidback Luke, Steve Aoki, Jacques Lu Cont, Chaka Khan, Plan B and Will I Am.

As part of Riley & Durrant, Durrant held residencies at Privilege and Amnesia Ibiza, Ministry of Sound in London and at Gatecrasher in Sheffield, where they met behind the DJ booth in 2002. Through their Electrik Playground and Nu Breed club nights, record labels and radio programs, Riley & Durrant have been influential in playing and promoting underground electronic music on UK radio.

In 2012, Durrant became the resident DJ and host for Ibiza Live at Eden Ibiza and Mallorca Live at BCM in Magaluf, playing weekly alongside Example, DJ Fresh, Dizzee Rascal, Tinie Tempah, Jessie J and Professor Green.

Durrant has also worked with Steve More remixing more pop and commercial artists such as Plan B, Flo Rida, The Saturdays, Jennifer Lopez, Vato Gonzalez, Lethal Bizzle, JLS, Lawson, Will I Am, Far East Movement and Paul Van Dyk and has produced album tracks for Avril Lavigne.

Discography

Official remixes

Artist albums

Singles

Producer packs
 Riley & Durrant Progressive House Producer (2009 Loopmasters)
 Riley & Durrant Progressive House Producer 2 (2010 Loopmasters)

Compilation albums
 Electrik Playground Ibiza: Mixed by Riley & Durrant (2008 Newstate Music)
 Quest for Trance 2: Mixed by Riley & Durrant (2005 United Records)
 Gatecrasher Russia: Mixed by Riley & Durrant (2004 Gatecrasher)

References

External links 

 Andi Durrant official website

1981 births
Living people
DJs from Leeds
English radio presenters
Capital (radio network)
Place of birth missing (living people)